Silesian weavers' uprising of 1844 (German: Schlesischer Weberaufstand) was a revolt against contractors who supplied the weavers of Silesia with raw material and gave them orders for finished textiles but drastically reduced their payments.

Silesia's industry was in bad condition in the decades after 1815. Silesian linen weavers suffered under Prussia's free trade policy and British competitors that already used machines destroyed the competitiveness of Silesian linen. The situation worsened after Russia imposed an import embargo and the Silesian linen industry began to mechanize. In several towns this traditional craft died out altogether, costing many linen weavers their profession. 

As social conditions worsened, growing unrest culminated in the Silesian cotton weavers' uprising of 1844. This uprising, on the eve of the revolution of 1848, was closely observed by German society and treated by several artists, among them Heinrich Heine (with his 1844 poem Die schlesischen Weber) and Gerhart Hauptmann (with his 1892 play The Weavers). It also attracted extensive attention among German thinkers such as Karl Marx.

Account
The journalist Friedrich Wolff described the events as follows:
In Silesian villages (18,000 inhabitants) cotton weaving was the most widespread occupation. There was extreme misery among the workers. The desperate need of jobs had been taken advantage by the contractors to reduce the prices of the goods they order ... 
On 4 June at 2 p.m. a large crowd of weavers emerged from their homes and marched in pairs up to the mansion of their contractors demanding higher wages. They were treated with scorns and threats alternatively. Consequently, a group of them forced their way into the house, smashed it's elegant window panes, furniture, porcelain ... another group broke into the storehouse and plundered it of cloth supplies which they tore to shreds ... The contractor fled with his family to a neighboring village which refused to shelter such a person. He returned 1 day later having requisitioned the army. In exchange that followed, eleven weavers were shot.

Thereafter, the Prussian government repressed them with great brutality.

In Literature
Heine's well-known work "The Silesian Weavers" premiered in Vorwärts!, depicting this uprising.

References

Industrial Revolution
Rebellions in Germany
19th-century rebellions
History of the textile industry
History of Silesia
Labor history